Tetrabenazine is a drug for the symptomatic treatment of hyperkinetic movement disorders. It is sold under the brand names Nitoman and Xenazine among others. On August 15, 2008, the U.S. Food and Drug Administration approved the use of tetrabenazine to treat chorea associated with Huntington's disease. Although other drugs had been used "off label," tetrabenazine was the first approved treatment for Huntington's disease in the U.S. The compound has been known since the 1950s.

Medical uses
Tetrabenazine is used as a treatment, but not as a cure, for hyperkinetic disorders such as:

 Huntington's disease – specifically, the chorea associated with it
 Tourette syndrome and other tic disorders
 Tardive dyskinesia, a serious and sometimes irreversible side effect of long-term use of many antipsychotics, mainly typical antipsychotics
 Hemiballismus, spontaneous flinging limb movements due to contra-lateral subthalamic nucleus damage

Tetrabenazine has been used as an antipsychotic in the treatment of schizophrenia, both in the past and in modern times.

Side effects
The most common adverse reactions, which have occurred in at least 10% of subjects in studies and at least 5% greater than in subjects who received placebo, have been: sedation or somnolence, fatigue, insomnia, depression, suicidal thoughts, akathisia, anxiety and nausea.

Warnings
There is a boxed warning associated with the use of tetrabenazine:

 Increases the risk of depression and suicidal thoughts and behavior in patients with Huntington's disease
 Balance risks of depression and suicidality with the clinical need for control of chorea when considering the use of tetrabenazine
 Monitor patients for emergence or worsening of depression, suicidality or unusual changes in behavior
 Inform patients, caregivers and families of the risk of depression and suicidality and instruct to report behaviours of concern promptly to the treating physician
 Exercise caution when treating patients with a history of depression or prior suicide attempts or ideation
 Tetrabenazine is contraindicated in patients who are actively suicidal and in patients with untreated or inadequately treated depression

Pharmacology

The precise mechanism of action of tetrabenazine is unknown. Its anti-chorea effect is believed to be due to a reversible depletion of monoamines such as dopamine, serotonin, norepinephrine, and histamine from nerve terminals. Tetrabenazine reversibly inhibits vesicular monoamine transporter 2, resulting in decreased uptake of monoamines into synaptic vesicles, as well as depletion of monoamine storage.

See also
 Deutetrabenazine

References

External links
Xenazine prescribing information FDA 
NIMH Repository data sheet
"Tetrabenazine" from HOPES: Huntington's Disease Outreach Project for Education at Stanford
Detailed monograph on tetrabenazine on rxmed.com
Information on tetrabenazine from netdoctor.co.uk

Anxiogenics
Huntington's disease
Ketones
Orphan drugs
Phenol ethers
Tardive dyskinesia
Tetrahydroisoquinolines
VMAT inhibitors